Borscht or barszcz is a sour soup common in Eastern Europe and Northern Asia. In English, the word "borscht" is most often associated with the soup's variant of Ukrainian origin, made with red beetroots as one of the main ingredients, which give the dish its distinctive red color. The same name, however, is also used for a wide selection of sour-tasting soups without beetroots, such as sorrel-based green borscht, rye-based white borscht, and cabbage borscht.

Borscht derives from an ancient soup originally cooked from pickled stems, leaves and umbels of common hogweed (Heracleum sphondylium), a herbaceous plant growing in damp meadows, which lent the dish its Slavic name. With time, it evolved into a diverse array of tart soups, among which the Ukrainian beet-based red borscht has become the most popular. It is typically made by combining meat or bone stock with sautéed vegetables, which – as well as beetroots – usually include cabbage, carrots, onions, potatoes, and tomatoes. Depending on the recipe, borscht may include meat or fish, or be purely vegetarian; it may be served either hot or cold, and it may range from a hearty one-pot meal to a clear broth or a smooth drink.

Its popularity has spread throughout Eastern Europe and – by way of migration away from the Russian Empire – to other continents. In North America, borscht is often linked with either Jews or Mennonites, the groups who first brought it there from Europe. Several ethnic groups claim borscht, in its various local guises, as their own national dish consumed as part of ritual meals within Eastern Orthodox, Greek Catholic, Roman Catholic, and Jewish religious traditions.

In 2022, the United Nations Educational, Scientific, and Cultural Organization (UNESCO) announced that it had placed borscht on the List of Intangible Cultural Heritage in Need of Urgent Safeguarding due to the risk that Russia's invasion posed to the soup's status as an element of Ukraine's cultural heritage. The new status means Ukraine could now apply for special funds to finance projects promoting and protecting the dish.

Etymology 

The name ultimately derives from the word  ( or //), which is common to East Slavic languages, such as Ukrainian. Together with cognates in other Slavic languages, it comes from Proto-Slavic *bŭrščǐ 'hogweed' and ultimately from Proto-Indo-European *bhr̥stis 'point, stubble'. Common hogweed was the soup's principal ingredient before it was replaced with other vegetables, notably beetroot in the Ukrainian version.

The English spelling borscht comes from Yiddish , as the dish was first popularized in North America by Yiddish-speaking Ashkenazi Jews from Eastern Europe.

Ingredients and preparation 
Traditional Ukrainian borscht is typically made from meat or bone stock, sautéed vegetables, and beet sour (i.e., fermented beetroot juice). Depending on the recipe, some of these components may be omitted or substituted.

The stock is typically made by boiling meat, bones, or both. Beef, pork or a combination of both are most commonly used, with brisket, ribs, shank and chuck considered to give the most flavorful results, especially if cooked on a high flame. Marrow bones are considered best for the bone stock. Meat stock is usually cooked for about two hours, whereas bone stock takes four to six hours to prepare. Meat and bones are usually removed afterwards and the meat is only added back into the soup about 10–15 minutes before the borscht is done. Some recipes call for smoked meats, resulting in a distinctively smoky borscht, while others use poultry or mutton stock. Fasting varieties are typically made with fish stock to avoid the use of meat, while purely vegetarian recipes often substitute forest mushroom broth for the stock.

The vegetables most commonly added to borscht are beetroots, white cabbage, carrots, parsley root, potatoes, onions and tomatoes. Some recipes may also call for beans, tart apples, turnip, swede, celeriac, zucchini or bell peppers. Parsnip may be used as a substitute for parsley root, and tomato paste is often used as well as or instead of fresh tomatoes. Vegetables are usually julienned, except for potatoes and zucchini, which are diced. The beetroots may be partially baked before being sprinkled with vinegar or lemon juice to preserve the color and braised separately from other vegetables.

Onions, carrots, parsley root, turnip and other root vegetables are sautéed (traditionally in animal fat, especially lard or butter) and then mixed with tomatoes or tomato paste. Dry beans are boiled separately. Potatoes and cabbage are boiled in the stock for about 15 minutes before the precooked vegetables are added.

The traditional technique of preparing the soup is to precook the vegetables – by sautéing, braising, boiling or baking – separately from the meat and only then to combine them with the stock. This distinctive feature of borscht derives from the practice of slow cooking in the Russian oven (traditional masonry stove, used for both cooking and heating), wherein the differences in cooking times of individual ingredients had to be taken into account in order to ensure that all components reach doneness at the same time.

The soup is typically flavored with a wide selection of herbs, spices and condiments. Salt, black pepper, garlic, bay leaves and dill are among the most commonly used. Other aromatics often added to borscht include allspice, celery stalks, parsley, marjoram, hot peppers, saffron, horseradish, ginger and prunes. Some recipes require flour or roux to further thicken the borscht. A common opinion is that a good borscht should be thick enough in amount of ingredients for a spoon to stand upright in it.

Beet sour 

The dominant tastes in borscht are sweet and sour. This combination is traditionally obtained by adding beet sour. The sour is made by covering sliced beetroots with lukewarm preboiled water and allowing bacteria to ferment some of the sugars present in beetroots into dextran (which gives the liquid a slightly viscous consistency), mannitol, acetic acid and lactic acid. Stale rye bread is often added to hasten the process, but usually omitted in Jewish recipes, as chametz (leavened bread) would make the sour unfit for Passover meals. Sugar, salt and lemon juice may be also added to balance the flavor. After about 2–5 days (or 2–3 weeks without the bread), the deep red, sweet and sour liquid may be strained and is ready to use. It is added to borscht shortly before the soup is done, as prolonged boiling would cause the tart flavor to dissipate. 

Apart from its employment in borscht, it may be also added to prepared horseradish or used as pot roast marinade.

As the traditional method of making borscht with beet sour often requires planning at least several days ahead, many recipes for quicker borscht replace the beet sour with fresh beetroot juice, while the sour taste is imparted by other ingredients. Vinegar, tomato products, lemon juice or citric acid may be used, as well as dry red wine, dill pickle juice, murături juice, sauerkraut juice, tart apples, Mirabelle plums, apricots,  or a fermented rye flour and water mixture.

Variations

Ukrainian 

As the home country of beetroot borscht, Ukraine boasts great diversity of the soup's regional variants, with virtually every oblast' having its own recipe. Differences between particular varieties may regard the type of stock used (meat, bone, or both), the kind of meat (beef, pork, poultry, etc.), the choice of vegetables and the method of cutting and cooking them. For example, although the typical recipe calls for beef and pork, the Kyiv variant uses mutton or lamb as well as beef, while in the Poltava region, the stock for borscht is cooked on poultry meat, that is, chicken, duck or goose. The use of zucchini, beans and apples is characteristic of the Chernihiv borscht; in this variant, beetroots are sautéed in vegetable oil rather than lard, and the sour taste comes solely from tomatoes and tart apples. The Lviv borscht is based on bone stock and is served with chunks of Vienna sausages.

Russian 
Many regional recipes for borscht have also developed in Russian cuisine. Examples include the Moscow borscht, served with pieces of beef, ham and Vienna sausages; Siberian borscht with meatballs; and Pskov borscht with dried smelt from the local lakes. Other unique Russian variants include a monastic Lenten borscht with marinated kelp instead of cabbage and the Russian Navy borscht, the defining characteristic of which is that the vegetables are cut into square or diamond-shaped chunks rather than julienned.

Polish 

It is made by combining strained meat-and-vegetable stock with wild mushroom broth and beet sour. In some versions, smoked meat may be used for the stock and the tartness may be obtained or enhanced by adding lemon juice, dill pickle brine, or dry red wine. It may be served either in a soup bowl or – especially at dinner parties – as a hot beverage in a twin-handled cup, with a croquette or a filled pastry on the side. Unlike other types of borscht, it is not whitened with sour cream. 

, or Christmas Eve borscht, is a variant of the clear borscht that is traditionally served during the Polish Christmas Eve supper. In this version, meat stock is either omitted or replaced with fish broth, usually made by boiling the heads cut off from fish used in other Christmas Eve dishes.

Jewish 
Ashkenazi Jews living in Eastern Europe adopted beetroot borscht from their Slavic neighbors and adapted it to their taste and religious requirements. As combining meat with milk is proscribed by kosher dietary laws, Jews have developed two variants of the soup: meat and dairy. The meat variant is typically made from beef brisket (pork is never used) and cabbage, while the dairy one is vegetarian, blended with sour cream or a mixture of milk and egg yolks. Both variants typically contain beetroots and onions, and are flavored with beet sour, vinegar or citric acid for tartness and beet sugar for sweetness. Galician Jews traditionally liked their borscht particularly sweet. Jewish borscht may be served either hot or cold, typically with a hot boiled potato on the side. In prewar Eastern Europe it was traditionally put up to ferment around Purim so that it would be ready four weeks later for the Passover holiday.

Cold borscht  

In the summertime, cold borscht is a popular alternative to the aforementioned variants, which are normally served hot. It consists of beet sour or beet juice blended with sour cream, buttermilk, soured milk, kefir or yogurt. The mixture has a distinctive pink or magenta color. It is served refrigerated, typically over finely chopped beetroot, cucumbers, radishes and green onion, together with halves of a hard-boiled egg and sprinkled with fresh dill. Chopped veal, ham, or crawfish tails may be added as well.

This soup was known in the Grand Duchy of Lithuania, which comprised the territories of modern-day Lithuania and Belarus, and it is still part of the culinary traditions of these and neighboring nations. In Lithuanian, it is known as Šaltibarščiai. Soviet "Encyclopedia of Housekeeping" has an article on borscht: said article lists proper "cold borscht" recipe.

"Coated" dressed herring salad resembles Šaltibarščiai cold borsht as well, despite not being a soup. The similarity includes strong color from using beets, similar choice of vegetables, and the "decorative" addition of boiled eggs.

Variants without beets 
Although borscht is mostly used to describe a beet-based soup, there are some exceptions. In some culinary cultures, there are soups with the same name or similar names. In such soups, beetroots are not used or merely optional. The principal common trait among such borschts is a tart flavor from sour-tasting ingredients. According to A Gift to Young Housewives, a book from the 19th century, "borscht" may or may not include beets (depending from recipe to recipe in the book).
 
It is typically flavored with garlic and marjoram, and served over eggs and boiled fresh sausage; the water in which the sausage was boiled is often used instead of meat stock.

In the Carpathian Mountains of southern Poland, variants of borscht are also made in which the tart taste comes from dairy products, such as whey or buttermilk.

Green borscht, a light soup made from leaf vegetables, is an example common in Ukrainian and Russian cuisines. The naturally tart-tasting sorrel is most commonly used, but spinach, chard, nettle, garden orache and occasionally dandelion, goutweed or ramsons, may be added as well, especially after the spring season for sorrel has passed. Like beetroot borscht, it is based on meat or vegetable broth and is typically served with boiled potatoes and hard-boiled eggs, sprinkled with dill. There is also a variety of Ukrainian green borscht which includes both sorrel and beetroots.

In Romanian and Moldovan cuisines, a mixture of wheat bran or cornmeal with water that has been left to ferment, similar to, but less cloudy than that used in Polish white borscht, is called .

The Armenian, Azerbaijani and Georgian version of borscht is a hot soup made with beef stock, green peppers and other vegetables, which may or may not include beetroots, and flavored with chopped red chili and fresh cilantro. In ethnic Mennonite cuisine, borscht refers to a whole range of seasonal vegetable soups based on beef or chicken stock – from spring borscht made with spinach, sorrel and chard to summer borscht with cabbage, tomatoes, maize and squash to fall and winter borscht with cabbage, beets and potatoes.

In Shanghai's Haipai cuisine, tomatoes are the main ingredient; beef and its broth, onions and cabbages are also added; while flour, rather than sour cream, is used for thickening.

Garnishes and sides 
The diversity of borscht styles is matched by the wide choice of garnishes and side dishes with which various kinds of borscht may be served.

The sour cream may be served in a separate pitcher for the diners to add the desired amount themselves or the borscht may come already "whitened", that is, blended with sour cream. Sometimes the cream is thickened with flour before being added to the soup. Yogurt and a mixture of milk and yolks are possible substitutes.

Chopped herbs are often sprinkled on the surface of the soup; dill is most common, but parsley, chives or scallion are often added as well. Individual helpings may be spiced up with minced hot peppers or garlic. Many kinds of borscht are served over halves or quarters of hard-boiled chicken or quail eggs. Navy beans, broad beans or string beans are also a common addition.

Meat, removed from the stock on which the borscht was based, may be cut into smaller chunks and either added back into the soup or served on the side with horseradish or mustard. Bacon and sausages are also commonly used as borscht garnishes. Borscht based on bone stock may be served Old Polish style, with marrow from the bones.

Siberian borscht is eaten with boiled meatballs of minced beef and onion. Mushroom-filled  are particularly associated with Polish Christmas Eve borscht.

Borscht, like any other soup in East Slavic cuisines, is seldom eaten by itself, but rather accompanied by a side dish. At a minimum, spoonfuls of borscht are alternated with bites of a slice of bread. Buckwheat groats or boiled potatoes, often topped with pork cracklings, are other simple possibilities, but a range of more involved sides exists as well.

An even more exquisite way to serve borscht is with a coulibiac, or a large loaf-shaped pie. Possible fillings for croquettes,  and coulibiacs include mushrooms, sauerkraut and minced meat.

History

Origin 

Borscht derives from a soup originally made by the Slavs from common hogweed (also known as cow parsnip), which lent the dish its Slavic name. Growing commonly in damp meadows throughout the north temperate zone, hogweed was used not only as fodder (as its English names suggest), but also for human consumption – from Eastern Europe to Siberia, to northwestern North America.

The Slavs collected hogweed in May and used its roots for stewing with meat,. As for the stems, leaves, and umbels; these would be chopped, covered with water and left in a warm place to ferment. After a few days, lactic and alcoholic fermentation produced a mixture described as "something between beer and sauerkraut". This fermented product was then used for cooking a soup.

The said soup—with aforementioned fermented hogweed concoction used—was characterized by a mouth-puckering amount of sourness in its taste, while its smell was described as pungent As the Polish ethnographer  wrote in 1830, "Poles have been always partial to tart dishes, which are somewhat peculiar to their homeland and vital to their health." Simon Syrenius, a 17th-century Polish botanist, described "our Polish hogweed" as a vegetable that was well known throughout Poland, Ruthenia, Lithuania and Samogitia (that is, most of the northern part of Eastern Europe), typically used for cooking a "tasty and graceful soup" with capon stock, eggs, sour cream and millet. More interested in the plant's medicinal properties than its culinary use, he also recommended pickled hogweed juice as a cure for fever or hangover.

One of the earliest possible mentions of borscht as a soup is found in the diary of German merchant Martin Gruneweg, who visited Kyiv in 1584. After Gruneweg reached river Borshchahivka in Kyiv's vicinity on 17 October 1584, he wrote down a local legend saying that the river was so named because there was a borscht market. However, he doubted the story noting that: "Ruthenians buy borscht rarely or never, because everyone cooks their own at home as it's their staple food and drink".

It recommends growing the plant "by the fence, around the whole garden, where the nettle grows", to cook a soup of it in springtime and reminds the reader to, "for the Lord's sake, share it with those in need".

Hogweed borscht was mostly a poor man's food. The soup's humble beginnings are still reflected in Polish fixed expressions, where "cheap like borscht" is the equivalent of "dirt cheap" (also attested as a calque in Yiddish and Canadian English), whereas adding "two mushrooms into borscht" is synonymous with excess. For the professors of the University of Kraków, who led a monastic way of life in the 17th century, hogweed borscht was a fasting dish which they ate regularly (sometimes with deviled eggs) from Lent till Rogation days. It was uncommon on the royal table, although according to the 16th-century Polish botanist Marcin of Urzędów – citing , a court physician to the Jagiellonian kings of Hungary – the Polish-born King Vladislaus II used to have a Polish hogweed-based dish prepared for him at his court in Buda.

Diversification 
With time, other ingredients were added to the soup, eventually replacing hogweed altogether, and the names  or  became generic terms for any sour-tasting soup. In 19th-century rural Poland, this term included soups made from barberries, currants, gooseberries, cranberries, celery or plums.

When describing the uses of common hogweed, John Gerard, a 17th-century English botanist, observed that "the people of [Poland] and Lithuania [used] to make [a] drink with the decoction of this herb and leaven or some other thing made of meal, which is used instead of beer and other ordinary drink." It may suggest that hogweed soup was on some occasions combined with a fermented mixture of water and barley flour, oatmeal or rye flour. Such soured, gelatinous flour-and-water mixture, originally known as kissel (from the Proto-Slavic root *kyslŭ, 'sour') had been already mentioned in The Tale of Bygone Years, a 12th-century chronicle of Kievan Rus', and continued to be a staple of Ukrainian and Russian cooking until the middle of the 19th century.

The earliest known Polish recipes for borscht, written by chefs catering to Polish magnates (aristocrats), are from the late 17th century. , head chef to Prince , included several borscht recipes in his  (A Collection of Dishes), the first cookbook published originally in Polish, in 1682. They include such sour soups as lemon borscht and "royal borscht", the latter made from assorted dried, smoked or fresh fish and fermented rye bran. A manuscript recipe collection from the  family court, dating back to ca. 1686, contains an instruction for making hogweed borscht mixed with poppy seeds or ground almonds. As this was a Lenten dish, it was garnished, in a  fashion typical of Baroque cuisine, with mock eggs made from finely chopped pike that was partly dyed with saffron and formed into oval balls. An alternative recipe for the almond borscht replaced pickled hogweed with vinegar.

Borscht also evolved into a variety of sour soups to the east of Poland. Examples include onion borscht, a recipe for which was included in a 1905 Russian cookbook, and sorrel-based green borscht, which is still a popular summer soup in Ukraine and Russia. A Gift to Young Housewives by Elena Molokhovets, the best-selling Russian cookbook of the 19th century, first published in 1861, contains nine recipes for borscht, some of which are based on kvass, a traditional Slavic fermented beverage made from rye bread. Kvass-based variants were also known in Ukraine at that time; some of them were types of green borscht, while others were similar to the Russian .

Before the advent of beet-based borscht, cabbage borscht was of particular importance. Made from either fresh cabbage or sauerkraut, it could be indistinguishable from the Russian . Indeed, the mid-19th-century Explanatory Dictionary of the Living Great Russian Language defines  as "a kind of " with beet sour added for tartness. The significance of cabbage as an essential ingredient of borscht is manifest in the Ukrainian proverb, "without bread, it's no lunch; without cabbage, it's no borscht."

Novel ingredients: beets, tomatoes and potatoes 

Beet, a plant native to the Mediterranean Basin, was already grown in antiquity. Only the leaves were of culinary use, as the tapered, tough, whitish and bitter-tasting root was considered unfit for human consumption. It is likely that beet greens were used in variants of green borscht long before the invention of the beetroot-based red borscht. Beet varieties with round, red, sweet taproots, known as beetroots, were not reliably reported until the 12th century and did not spread to Eastern Europe before the 16th century. 

, a Polish Renaissance poet and moralist, included the earliest known Polish recipe for pickled beetroots in his 1568 book, Life of an Honest Man. The sour found some applications in Polish folk medicine as a cure for hangover and – mixed with honey – as a sore throat remedy.

It may never be known who first thought of using beet sour to flavor borscht, which also gave the soup its now-familiar red color. One of the earliest mentions of borscht with pickled beets comes from Russian ethnographer Andrey Meyer, who wrote in his 1781 book that people in Ukraine make fermented red beets with Acanthus, which they in turn use to cook their borscht. The book "Description of the Kharkiv Governorate" of 1785, which describes the food culture of the Ukrainians, says that borscht was the most consumed food, cooked from beets and cabbage with various other herbal spices and millet, on sour kvass; it was always made with pork lard or beef lard, on holidays with lamb or poultry, and sometimes with game. 's Polish-German dictionary published in 1806 was the first to define  as a tart soup made from pickled beetroots. 

Ukrainian legends, probably of 19th-century origin, attribute the invention of beetroot borscht either to Zaporozhian Cossacks, serving in the Polish army, on their way to break the siege of Vienna in 1683, or to Don Cossacks, serving in the Russian army, while laying siege to Azov in 1695.

Spanish conquistadors brought potatoes and tomatoes from the Americas to Europe in the 16th century, but these vegetables only became commonly grown and consumed in Eastern Europe in the 19th century. Eventually, both became staples of peasant diet and essential ingredients of Ukrainian and Russian borscht. Potatoes replaced turnips in borscht recipes, and tomatoes – fresh, canned or paste – took over from beet sour as the source of tartness. The turnip is rarely found in modern recipes, and even then, together with potatoes. In Ukraine, beet sour and tomatoes were both used for some time until the latter ultimately prevailed during the last third of the 19th century.

Global spread 
Over the course of the 19th and 20th centuries, borscht's popularity spread beyond its Slavic homeland, largely due to such factors as territorial expansion of the Russian Empire, Russia's growing political clout and cultural stature, and waves of emigration out of the country. As Russia grew to cover most of northern and central Eurasia, borscht was introduced to the cuisines of various peoples inhabiting the territories both within and adjacent to the empire, from Finland to the Caucasus and Iran, to Central Asia and China, to Alaska (Russian America).

Borscht's westward expansion was less successful; Germans used to scoff at the soup along with other East European fare. What helped familiarize Western Europe with borscht was the practice of Russian emperors, as well as Russian and Polish aristocrats, to employ celebrated French chefs, who later presented their own versions of the dish as a foreign curiosity back in France. In his take on borscht, the original Russian soup served only as inspiration for an extravagant  dish with an air of eastern exoticism. Apart from vegetables and beet sour, his recipe calls for a roast chicken, a fried chicken, a duck, a piece of veal, an oxtail, a marrow bone, one pound of bacon, and six large sausages, and suggests serving with beef quenelles, deviled eggs and croûtons. 

In 1867, beetroot borscht was served, along with herrings, sturgeon, coulibiac, Pozharsky cutlets and vinaigrette salad, at a Russian-themed dinner at the International Exposition in Paris, strengthening its international association with Russian culture.

Mass migration from the Russian Empire to North America – initially mostly by members of persecuted religious minorities – was instrumental in bringing borscht across the Atlantic. Jews from the Pale of Settlement, an area that stretched along the western edges of the Russian Empire and included much of present-day Ukraine, brought with them Ukrainian variety of borscht with beetroot. The earliest waves of migration, however, occurred at a time when cabbage-based borscht was still the dominant variant of the soup in at least parts of Russia. According to the  Jewish Encyclopedia published in 1906, cabbage-based kraut borscht was also more popular than the beet-based variant in American Jewish cuisine at the time. Subsequent Jewish immigration helped popularize the red borscht in America.

In the 1930s, when most American hotels refused to accept Jewish guests due to widespread anti-Semitism, New York Jews began flocking to Jewish-owned resorts in the Catskill Mountains for their summer vacations. The area grew into a major center of Jewish entertainment, with restaurants offering all-you-can-eat Ashkenazi Jewish fare, including copious amounts of borscht. Grossinger's, one of the largest resorts, served borscht throughout the day, every day of the year. The region became known, initially in derision, as the "Borscht Belt", reinforcing the popular association between borscht and American Jewish culture. 

As most visitors arrived in the summertime, the borscht was typically served cold. Marc Gold was one of its largest suppliers, producing 1,750 short tons (1,590 tonnes) a year in his business's heyday. Gold's borscht consists of puréed beetroots seasoned with sugar, salt and citric acid; it is usually blended with sour cream and served as a refreshing beverage, more aptly described as a "beet smoothie". Such kind of "purplish, watery broth" is, according to Nikolai Burlakoff, author of The World of Russian Borsch, "associated in America with borsch, in general, and Jewish borsch in particular."

Borscht in the USSR 
In the Soviet Union, borscht was one of the most popular everyday dishes. It was described by James Meek, a British correspondent in Kyiv and Moscow, as "the common denominator of the Soviet kitchen, the dish that tied together ... the high table of the Kremlin and the meanest canteen in the boondocks of the Urals, ... the beetroot soup that pumped like the main artery through the kitchens of the east Slav lands". Among Soviet leaders, the Ukrainian-born Leonid Brezhnev was especially partial to borscht, which his wife continued to personally cook for him even after they had moved into the Kremlin.

The soup has even played a role in the Soviet space program. In March 1961, as part of a communications equipment test, a pre-recorded recipe for borscht was broadcast from the Korabl-Sputnik 4 spacecraft. The craft, carrying animals and a mannequin, had been launched into low Earth orbit in preparation for crewed space flights. Actual borscht eventually made its way into outer space as space food for Soviet and, later, Russian cosmonauts. Originally, a puréed version of borscht was supplied in tubes.

All ingredients for the space borscht (which include beef, beetroots, cabbage, potatoes, carrots, onions, parsley root, and tomato paste) were cooked separately, then combined one by one in strictly controlled order, sterilized, packed into tubes, sealed airtight and autoclaved. In the 1970s, the tubes were replaced with packages of rehydratable freeze-dried borscht with regular-size bits of cooked vegetables.

However, with urbanization and mass construction of Khrushchyovka type housing, borscht would be affected; there would be no comfortable place to make own days-long dishes with "kvass" and sour foods, in a tiny apartment. At this rate, the idea of making its beet sour lost its initial appeal, making borscht in USSR mainly about beets, not about sourness.

Such a typical Soviet-era book as Entsyclopedia Domashnego Hozyaistva (literally "Encyclopedia of Housekeeping") has an article on borscht. The article offers a soup with beets, other vegetables, and tartness source ("tomato puree") as "borscht" in general, but its "no-nation" primary recipe of meat borscht says "uksus po vkusu (Cyrillic: уксус по вкусу)", e.g. only to add vinegar upon tasting the resulting soup. Simply put, the borscht's sourness became an option, not a requirement, for a "generic" Soviet soup known as borscht, effectively parting ways with older styles of making sour soups (ones both with or without beets). 
 However, the same article mentions the sour soups: it lists separate "Ukrainian borscht" and "Cold borscht" recipes. The "Ukrainian borscht" one properly instructs to make the sour soup with beets by saying "sbriiznyt' uksusom (Cyrillic: сбрызнуть уксусом)", literally instructs to "sprinkle with vinegar" while cooking Ukrainian borscht.
 A beet infusion for borscht is also mentioned in the said article. It involves soaking a beet with boiled water + adding some vinegar. Again, this makeshift-like substitute for beet sour is listed in the aforementioned Soviet encyclopedia as a way to color borscht, not to sour it.

Era of Stagnation also would affect making borscht from time to time to the next level of simplification: aforementioned canned tomato products, "paste" or "puree" would be a "deficit" item, a thing not available regularly in one's nearest store. At this rate, many modern recipes of beet soups labeled as "borscht" actually have neither a tartness source (lack tomatoes, pickles, etc.) nor a sourness source (lack vinegar, lemon acid powder, let alone beet sour kvass).

In culture

As a ritual dish 
Borscht is often associated with its role in religious traditions of various denominations (Eastern Orthodox, Greek and Roman Catholic, and Jewish) that are common in Eastern Europe. In East Slavic countries, "memorial borscht" is served as the first course at a post-funeral wake. According to a traditional belief, the soul of the departed either feeds on or is carried up to heaven by puffs of steam rising from bowls of borscht and other hot dishes, such as blini, porridge, boiled potatoes or freshly baked bread.

In Poland and Ukraine, borscht is usually one of the dishes served at a Christmas Eve dinner. Celebrated after the first star has appeared in the sky on December 24 (Roman Catholic) or January 6 (Greek Catholic), it is a meal which is at the same time festive and fasting, a multicourse affair (traditionally, with twelve distinct dishes) that excludes ingredients of land-animal origin. Christmas Eve borscht is, therefore, either vegetarian or based on fish stock and is not typically mixed with sour cream. In Ukraine, the soup contains vegetables that are sautéed in vegetable oil rather than lard, as well as beans and mushrooms. It may be also thickened with wheat flour dry-roasted in a pan instead of the usual roux. The Polish version of Christmas Eve borscht is a clear ruby-red broth.

Youths used to celebrate Holy Saturday, the last day of the fast, with a mock "funeral" of the white borscht, in which a pot of the soup was either buried in the ground or broken, sometimes – to the crowd's amusement – while being carried by an unsuspecting boy on his head. On the next day, the white borscht would reappear on the Easter table, but this time, in its more coveted, meat-based guise with sausage, bacon and eggs.

As the holiday is observed in spring (March or April), the preparation of Passover borscht used to provide an opportunity to use up the beet sour left over from pickled beetroots that had been consumed during winter, remaining potatoes that had been stored throughout the winter and sour cream that was readily available in the new calving season. Cold borscht blended with sour cream is also popular on Shavuot (Feast of Weeks), a holiday customarily associated with dairy foods, observed in late May or early June. Seudah Shlishit, or the third meal of the Shabbat, often includes borscht as well.

As an ethnic dish 
In its currently most popular, beet-based version, borscht most likely originated in what is now Ukraine. Borscht's role as a staple of everyday Ukrainian diet is reflected in the Ukrainian saying, "borscht and porridge are our food" (compare the equivalent Russian saying, where borscht is replaced with ). The hearty soup in which the beetroot is just one of sundry vegetables, as opposed to the typically Polish clear beet broth, is still known in Poland as "Ukrainian borscht".

Borscht is associated with and claimed by several ethnic groups, especially Ukrainians, Russians, Poles, Lithuanians and Ashkenazi Jews, as their own national or ethnic dish and cultural icon. Such claims are not necessarily mutually exclusive, as the soup's history predates the emergence in Eastern Europe of modern nation states with their ever-shifting borders. Borscht, in the words of Burlakoff, "is perfectly suited to a global culture." He describes it as "a global phenomenon", in which "local variants are so numerous and diverse that it is hard sometimes for a non-specialist to grasp that any single example of it is something that is part of a unified tradition." In his view, borscht "is an almost perfect example of ... 'glocalization' – a phenomenon that is global in distribution but reflective of local needs and ways in its variants and adaptation; ... a highly localized product that became globalized, and in the process adapted to conditions other than the original ones." 

However, according to Irina Perianova, a Russian linguist and anthropologist, "people tend to be very proprietal about their food and proud of it." Perianova offers competing Russian and Ukrainian views on the origin and ingredients of borscht as an example of "a common connection between culinary and territorial claims", which results in the culinary area turning into "a battlefield generating and proliferating all kinds of myths." In 2020 Ukraine began the process to have borscht recognised as an element of the country's intangible cultural heritage, an initiative supported by chefs and food writers such as Marianna Dushar.

In the Soviet Union, government-sponsored cookbooks, such as The Book of Tasty and Healthy Food curated by Anastas Mikoyan, Cookery and Directory of Recipes and Culinary Production, promoted a unified Soviet cuisine with standardized and nutritionally "rational" versions of traditional dishes. The same cooking techniques and recipes were taught in culinary vocational schools throughout the country, establishing a common cooking style in Soviet cafés and restaurants. Though inspired by the cuisines of the country's various ethnic groups, many recipes were presented as part of an overall Soviet heritage, disassociated from their individual geographic origins. 

By many people both inside and outside the Soviet Union, borscht was increasingly seen not as an ethnic Ukrainian soup, but as a Soviet or – metonymically – Russian dish. This approach was criticized by William Pokhlebkin, a preeminent Russian food writer, who unequivocally described beet-based borscht  as one of the "dishes of Ukrainian cookery" which "have entered the menu of international cuisine". "One could understand", he wrote, "and forgive foreigners for calling borscht or  Russian national dishes, but when it turns out that they gleaned the information from Soviet cookbooks or from restaurant menus, one is embarrassed for our authors and chefs, who popularize the national cuisines of our peoples [that is, the ethnic groups of the Soviet Union] with such ignorance."

According to Meek: Pokhlebkin and the Soviet Union are dead, yet Borshchland lives on. Recipes, like birds, ignore political boundaries. ... The faint outline of the Tsarist-Soviet imperium still glimmers in the collective steam off bowls of beetroot and cabbage in meat stock, and the soft sound of dollops of sour cream slipping into soup, from the Black Sea to the Sea of Japan and, in emigration, from Brooklyn to Berlin.

See also
 List of soups
 Three grand soups in Japanese culture

Notes

References

Sources

Secondary

Other languages
 
 
 
 
 
 
 
 
 
 

 
 
  Pages unnumbered.

Primary or self-published

Reference works 

 
 
 
 
 
 
 
 
 
 
 
 
 
 
 
 
 
 
 
 
 
 
 
 
 
 
 
 
 
 
 

Ukrainian cuisine
Slavic cuisine
Cold soups
Vegetable dishes
Armenian soups
Ashkenazi Jewish cuisine
Azerbaijani soups
Belarusian cuisine
Lithuanian cuisine
Polish soups
Russian soups
Romanian cuisine
Soviet cuisine
Ukrainian soups
National dishes
National symbols of Ukraine
Ukrainian traditions
Ukrainian inventions
Christmas food